Molynes United F.C. is a Jamaican football club located in Kingston. They were promoted to the National Premier League in 2019.

Molynes United play home games at Jacisera Park since 2018 after their old Chalmers Avenue ground was taken over by Digicel. They have also played matches in Constant Spring, including to start off their Premier League tenure as Jacisera Park's stand was not complete in time for the start of the 2019–20 Jamaica National Premier League season.

History
Molynes United were founded in 1991.

Molynes United were promoted to the National Premier League in 2019 after winning their first five matches in the promotion play-offs. The club were led in their push by head coach Lijyasu Simms, who has helped three different teams gain promotion to Jamaica's top flight. They defeated Portmore United 3–0 in their inaugural Jamaica National Premier League fixture.

Current squad
2019/20 season

	

	

Football clubs in Jamaica

Out on Loan
 Thorn Simpson (North Carolina FC)

References